Hamnøy or Hamnøya is a small fishing village in Moskenes Municipality in Nordland county, Norway. Hamnøy was previously connected to Reine by ferry, but this was replaced by bridges on the European route E10 highway as part of the Lofoten Mainland Connection.

References

Moskenes
Villages in Nordland
Populated places of Arctic Norway